The 2001 Colgate Raiders football team was an American football team that represented Colgate University during the 2001 NCAA Division I-AA football season. Colgate finished second in the Patriot League.

In its sixth season under head coach Dick Biddle, the team compiled a 7–3 record. Ken Kubec and Ron Hampton were the team captains. 

The Raiders outscored opponents 247 to 189. Colgate's 5–1 conference record placed second in the Patriot League standings, edging 5–2 Fordham by a margin of half a game. Colgate was not able to schedule a matchup with the league's newest member, Georgetown University, accounting for the difference in the number of league games played.

Just before the start of the season, in mid-August, the university trustees announced that Colgate would shorten its athletics nickname to simply "Raiders". Though the longstanding "Red Raiders" name was not originally a reference to Native Americans, such imagery had built up over the years, and the students and faculty who had asked for the change cited increasing sensitivity to racial stereotypes as their reason.

Like most of the Patriot League, Colgate played just 10 of its 11 scheduled games, after its September 15 matchup, against Ivy League opponent Dartmouth, was canceled following the September 11 attacks.

Colgate played its home games at Andy Kerr Stadium in Hamilton, New York.

Schedule

References

Colgate
Colgate Raiders football seasons
Colgate Raiders football